The fluctuation–dissipation theorem (FDT) or fluctuation–dissipation relation (FDR) is a powerful tool in statistical physics for predicting the behavior of systems that obey detailed balance. Given that a system obeys detailed balance, the theorem is a proof that thermodynamic fluctuations in a physical variable  predict the response quantified by the admittance or impedance (to be intended in their general sense, not only in electromagnetic terms) of the same physical variable (like voltage, temperature difference, etc.), and vice versa. The fluctuation–dissipation theorem applies both to classical and quantum mechanical systems.

The fluctuation–dissipation theorem was proven by Herbert Callen and Theodore Welton in 1951 
and expanded by Ryogo Kubo. There are antecedents to the general theorem, including Einstein's explanation of Brownian motion
during his annus mirabilis and Harry Nyquist's explanation in 1928 of Johnson noise in electrical resistors.

Qualitative overview and examples

The fluctuation–dissipation theorem says that when there is a process that dissipates energy, turning it into heat (e.g., friction), there is a reverse process related to thermal fluctuations. This is best understood by considering some examples:

 Drag and Brownian motion
If an object is moving through a fluid, it experiences drag (air resistance or fluid resistance). Drag dissipates kinetic energy, turning it into heat. The corresponding fluctuation is Brownian motion. An object in a fluid does not sit still, but rather moves around with a small and rapidly-changing velocity, as molecules in the fluid bump into it. Brownian motion converts heat energy into kinetic energy—the reverse of drag.
 Resistance and Johnson noise
If electric current is running through a wire loop with a resistor in it, the current will rapidly go to zero because of the resistance. Resistance dissipates electrical energy, turning it into heat (Joule heating). The corresponding fluctuation is Johnson noise. A wire loop with a resistor in it does not actually have zero current, it has a small and rapidly-fluctuating current caused by the thermal fluctuations of the electrons and atoms in the resistor. Johnson noise converts heat energy into electrical energy—the reverse of resistance.
 Light absorption and thermal radiation
When light impinges on an object, some fraction of the light is absorbed, making the object hotter. In this way, light absorption turns light energy into heat. The corresponding fluctuation is thermal radiation (e.g., the glow of a "red hot" object). Thermal radiation turns heat energy into light energy—the reverse of light absorption. Indeed, Kirchhoff's law of thermal radiation confirms that the more effectively an object absorbs light, the more thermal radiation it emits.

Examples in detail
The fluctuation–dissipation theorem is a general result of statistical thermodynamics that quantifies the relation between the fluctuations in a system that obeys detailed balance and the response of the system to applied perturbations.

Brownian motion
For example, Albert Einstein noted in his 1905 paper on Brownian motion that the same random forces that cause the erratic motion of a particle in Brownian motion would also cause drag if the particle were pulled through the fluid. In other words, the fluctuation of the particle at rest has the same origin as the dissipative frictional force one must do work against, if one tries to perturb the system in a particular direction.

From this observation Einstein was able to use statistical mechanics to derive the Einstein–Smoluchowski relation

which connects the diffusion constant D and the particle mobility μ, the ratio of the particle's terminal drift velocity to an applied force. kB is the Boltzmann constant, and T is the absolute temperature.

Thermal noise in a resistor
In 1928, John B. Johnson discovered and Harry Nyquist explained Johnson–Nyquist noise.

 

This observation can be understood through the lens of the fluctuation-dissipation theorem. Take, for example, a simple circuit consisting of a resistor with a resistance  and a capacitor with a small capacitance . Kirchhoff's law yields

and so the response function for this circuit is

In the low-frequency limit , its imaginary part is simply

which then can be linked to the power spectral density function  of the voltage via the fluctuation-dissipation theorem

Hence

General formulation
The fluctuation–dissipation theorem can be formulated in many ways; one particularly useful form is the following:.

Let  be an observable of a dynamical system with Hamiltonian  subject to thermal fluctuations.
The observable  will fluctuate around its mean value 
with fluctuations characterized by a power spectrum .
Suppose that we can switch on a time-varying, spatially constant field  which alters the Hamiltonian
The response of the observable  to a time-dependent field  is 
characterized to first order by the susceptibility or linear response function
 of the system

 

Which holds under the Fourier transform convention .

A proof can be found by means of the LSZ reduction, an identity from quantum field theory.

The fluctuation–dissipation theorem can be generalized in a straightforward way to the case of space-dependent fields, to the case of several variables or to a quantum-mechanics setting. A special case in which the fluctuating quantity is the energy itself is the fluctuation-dissipation theorem for the frequency-dependent specific heat.

Derivation

Classical version
We derive the fluctuation–dissipation theorem in the form given above, using the same notation.
Consider the following test case: the field f has been on for infinite time and is switched off at t=0

 
where  is the Heaviside function.

 

The probability distribution function W(x,0) is an equilibrium distribution and hence
given by the Boltzmann distribution for the Hamiltonian 

 
where .
For a weak field , we can expand the right-hand side

 

here  is the equilibrium distribution in the absence of a field.
Plugging this approximation in the formula for  yields

where A(t) is the auto-correlation function of x in the absence of a field:

 

Note that in the absence of a field the system is invariant under time-shifts.
We can rewrite  using the susceptibility
of the system and hence find with the above equation (*)

 

Consequently,

To make a statement about frequency dependence, it is necessary to take the Fourier transform of equation (**). By integrating by parts, it is possible to show that
 

Since  is real and symmetric, it follows that

Finally, for stationary processes, the Wiener–Khinchin theorem states that the two-sided spectral density is equal to the Fourier transform of the auto-correlation function:
 

Therefore, it follows that

Quantum version

The fluctuation-dissipation theorem relates  the correlation function of the observable of interest  (a measure of fluctuation) to the imaginary part of the response function  in the frequency domain (a measure of dissipation).  A link between these quantities can be found through the so-called Kubo formula

which follows, under the assumptions of the linear response theory, from the time evolution of the ensemble average of the observable  in the presence of a perturbing source. Once Fourier transformed, the Kubo formula allows writing the imaginary part of the response function as

In the canonical ensemble, the second term can be re-expressed as

where in the second equality we re-positioned  using the cyclic property of trace. Next, in the third equality, we inserted  next to the trace and interpreted  as a time evolution operator   with imaginary time interval . The imaginary time shift turns into a  factor after Fourier transform

and thus the expression for  can be easily rewritten as the quantum fluctuation-dissipation relation 

The same calculation also yields

thus, differently from what obtained in the classical case, the power spectral density is not exactly frequency-symmetric in the quantum limit. Consistently,  has an imaginary part originating from the commutation rules of operators. An often cited result is also the symmetrized power spectral density

The "" can be thought of as linked to quantum fluctuations, or to zero-point motion of the observable . At high enough temperatures, i.e. the quantum contribution is negligible, and we recover the classical version.

Violations in glassy systems
While the fluctuation–dissipation theorem provides a general relation between the response of systems obeying detailed balance, when detailed balance is violated comparison of fluctuations to dissipation is more complex. Below the so called glass temperature , glassy systems are  not equilibrated, and slowly approach their equilibrium state. This slow approach to equilibrium is synonymous with the violation of detailed balance. Thus these systems require large time-scales to be studied while they slowly move toward equilibrium.

To study the violation of the fluctuation-dissipation relation in glassy systems, particularly spin glasses, Ref. performed numerical simulations of macroscopic systems (i.e. large compared to their correlation lengths) described by the three-dimensional Edwards-Anderson model using supercomputers. Then, at a later time , two dynamical observables are probed, namely the response function

and the spin-temporal correlation function

The fluctuation-dissipation relation in this system can be written in terms of these observables as

Their results confirm the expectation that as the system is left to equilibrate for longer times, the fluctuation-dissipation relation is closer to be satisfied.

In the mid-1990s, in the study of dynamics of spin glass models, a generalization of the fluctuation–dissipation theorem was discovered  that holds for asymptotic non-stationary states, where the temperature appearing in the equilibrium relation is substituted by an effective temperature with a non-trivial dependence on the time scales. 
This relation is proposed to hold in glassy systems beyond the models for which it was initially found.

See also
 Non-equilibrium thermodynamics
 Green–Kubo relations
 Onsager reciprocal relations
 Equipartition theorem
 Boltzmann distribution
 Dissipative system

Notes

References

Further reading
 Audio recording of a lecture by Prof. E. W. Carlson of Purdue University
 Kubo's famous text: Fluctuation-dissipation theorem
 
 

 
 
 
 
 
 

Statistical mechanics
Non-equilibrium thermodynamics
Physics theorems
Statistical mechanics theorems